Sergey Nikolayevich Lizunov (July 4, 1955–2003) is a Soviet sprint canoer who competed in the mid-1970s. At the 1976 Summer Olympics in Montreal, he finished sixth in the K-1 500 m event.

References
Sports-reference.com profile

1955 births
2003 deaths
Canoeists at the 1976 Summer Olympics
Olympic canoeists of the Soviet Union
Soviet male canoeists
Russian male canoeists